Scoparia juldusellus is a moth in the family Crambidae. It was described by Aristide Caradja in 1916. It is found in Xinjiang, China.

References

Moths described in 1916
Scorparia